The Quick Lane Bowl is a post-season college football bowl game certified by the NCAA that began play in the 2014 season. Backed by the Detroit Lions of the National Football League, the game features a bowl-eligible team from the Big Ten Conference competing against an opponent from the Mid-American Conference.
The Quick Lane Bowl is played at Ford Field in Detroit as a de facto replacement for the Little Caesars Pizza Bowl, and inherited its traditional December 26 scheduling. Unlike its predecessor, which placed the 8th place team in the Big Ten against the Mid-American champion, the competing teams are selected by conference representatives and not based on final rankings. The Ford Motor Company serves as title sponsor of the game through its auto shop brand Quick Lane.

The inaugural edition of the bowl was played on December 26, 2014, between the Rutgers Scarlet Knights and North Carolina Tar Heels. In the midst of the Coronavirus disease (COVID-19) pandemic the 2020 edition of the bowl was not played; although a specific reason was not given by organizers.

History 
Since 2002, Detroit's Ford Field had played host to the Motor City Bowl—later known as the Little Caesars Pizza Bowl for sponsorship reasons; a bowl game between the 8th placed team in the Big Ten Conference and the champion of the Mid-American Conference (MAC), which was first played in 1997 at the Pontiac Silverdome. In May 2013, ESPN reported that the Detroit Lions were planning to organize a new Big Ten bowl game at Ford Field against an Atlantic Coast Conference (ACC) opponent—Big Ten commissioner Jim Delany had expressed a desire to revamp the conference's lineup of bowl games for the 2014 season to keep them "fresh". In August 2013, the Lions officially confirmed the new, then-unnamed game, tentatively scheduled for December 30, 2014. The team had reached six-year deals with the Big Ten and ACC to provide tie-ins for the game; the teams playing in the bowl are to be picked by representatives from each participating conference.

The announcement of the Lions' bowl game, and the Little Caesars Pizza Bowl's loss of Ford Field as a venue, left the fate of the Little Caesars Pizza Bowl—which had a relatively lower-profile matchup—in jeopardy. Detroit Lions president Tom Lewand remarked that "very few" markets could adequately support hosting two major bowl games. Organizers were open to the possibility of moving the Little Caesars Pizza Bowl across the street to Comerica Park, home stadium of the Detroit Tigers, for 2014 as an outdoor game. Comerica Park, the Tigers, and game sponsor Little Caesars are all owned by Ilitch Holdings. However, these plans never came to fruition.

In August 2014, the Lions announced that the Ford Motor Company had acquired title sponsorship rights to the new Detroit bowl, now known as the Quick Lane Bowl—named for its auto shop brand, Quick Lane. It was also confirmed that the inaugural Quick Lane Bowl would inherit the Little Caesars Pizza Bowl's traditional date of December 26, and be televised by ESPN. In a statement to Crain's Detroit Business, Motor City Bowl co-founder Ken Hoffman confirmed that "there is no Pizza Bowl for 2014. We will have to see about the future", implying that the Little Caesars Pizza Bowl had been cancelled indefinitely; the December 2013 playing proved to be the final edition of the Little Caesars Pizza Bowl.

On October 21, 2014, the Quick Lane Bowl announced a secondary tie-in with the MAC. The inaugural Quick Lane Bowl, played in December 2014, featured Rutgers of the Big Ten and North Carolina of the ACC. Through the first six playings of the bowl, five ACC teams, four Big Ten teams, and three MAC teams have been featured.

Game results

Source:

MVPs

Most appearances
Updated through the December 2022 edition (8 games, 16 total appearances).

Teams with multiple appearances

Teams with a single appearance
Won (6): Boston College, Duke, New Mexico State, Pittsburgh, Rutgers, Western Michigan

Lost (8): Bowling Green, Central Michigan, Eastern Michigan, Georgia Tech, Maryland, Nevada, North Carolina, Northern Illinois

Appearances by conference
Updated through the December 2022 edition (8 games, 16 total appearances).

 Independent appearances: New Mexico State (2022)

Game records

Media coverage

Television

Radio
WDVD-FM and WJR (AM) were the flagship stations for the Quick Lane Bowl Radio Network for the first 6 years. Availability between the two to carry the game rotated depending on other Detroit area sporting events. That changed in 2021 when the Detroit Lions radio rights moved to WXYT, at which time it also became the flagship station for the Quick Lane Bowl Radio Network.

See also
 Sports in Detroit

References

External links
 

 
2014 establishments in Michigan
American football in Detroit
Annual sporting events in the United States
College football bowls
Recurring sporting events established in 2014